Frank Cooke may refer to:

 Frank Cooke (engineer) (1913–2005), American entrepreneur, engineer and inventor
 Frank J. Cooke (1922–1996), mayor of Norwalk, Connecticut (1961–1965)
 Frank Cooke (broadcaster) (1923–2007), broadcaster and writer
 Frank Cooke (barrister) (1862–1933), New Zealand lawyer and cricketer
 Franklin Cooke Jr., American politician and member of the Delaware House of Representatives

See also 
 Francis Cooke (disambiguation)
Frank Cook (disambiguation)